Irahistan or Irahestan is a historical region consisting of southern Fars Province and western Hormozgan Province in Iran.

The region of Irahistan currently consists of several counties in Fars province (Larestan, Khonj County, Gerash County, Lamerd County and Mohr County) and Bastak County, Bandar Lengeh County and Parsian County in Hormozgan. The region's importance grew during the Sassanid period with vast expansion of settlements in Irahistan.

In medieval times, the region was ruled by local lords until they were removed by a Safavid invasion in 1610. In the thirteenth century, the city of Lar became a center of trade and commerce in Irahistan and the population of this city grew rapidly, outpacing the more historical towns and cities. The people in this region speak Persian and Achomi.

Achomi people speak the Achomi language. The language is in decline and has reported eight dialects and it is understood by mainstream Persian speakers mostly. The Achomi people are of Persian descent. The majority of Achomi people are Sunni Muslims, with a Shia minority. In the thirteenth century, Lar briefly became a center of trade and commerce in southern Persia. Irahistan was nearly always an obscure region, never becoming involved in the politics and conflicts of mainstream Persia. This was due to independent rule during the Safavid times, but that has failed due to the British Empire "Anti Piracy Company" and continued to decline due to Reza Shah Pahlavi's centric policies and the Ayatollah policies. Ahmad Eghtedari noted in his book Ancient Larestan (1955): 
 
"To those people of the towns, villages, and ports of Larestan who have stayed in the land of their ancestors, with its glorious past and its desolate present.  And to those who have endured the hardship of migration to earn a living on the islands of the Persian Gulf and the Indian Ocean and in the towns of India, Arabia and other places.  They remember with joy their beloved birthplace and still grieve for its ruin." 

Achomi people refer to themselves as Khodmooni, a term literally meaning "part of ourselves".

See also 
Gerash
Bastak
Khonj
Lamerd
Achomi people
Achomi language

References

External links
Gerash.com

Fars Province
Hormozgan Province